Nicholas Ponting (born 13 June 1966) is a former professional badminton player from England.

Career

Olympic Games 
He was ranked No. 1 in the world at mixed doubles during 1993 and represented Great Britain at the 1992 and 1996 Olympic Games in Barcelona and Atlanta.

All England Open Badminton Championships 
He won the mixed doubles event at the 1994 All England Open Badminton Championships with Joanne Wright.

World Championships 
He won the bronze medal at the 1993 IBF World Championships in mixed doubles with Gillian Clark.

Commonwealth Games 
He represented England and won a gold medal in the mixed team event and a bronze medal in the mixed doubles with Joanne Wright, at the 1994 Commonwealth Games in Victoria, British Columbia, Canada.

Masters 
Ponting still plays competitive badminton and currently represents England on the International Masters circuit winning multiple National and All England Masters titles in singles, men's doubles and mixed doubles.

World Senior Championships and Senior European Championships Results:
 2009 World Championships Punta Umbria Spain – Gold medal 40+ men's doubles (with Chris Hunt) and Gold medal 40+ mixed doubles (with Julie Bradbury)
 2010 European Senior Championships Dundalk Ireland – Silver medal 40+ men's doubles (with Chris Hunt) and Gold medal 40+ mixed doubles (with Julie Bradbury)
 2011 World Championships Richmond Vancouver Canada – Gold medal 40+ men's doubles (with Chris Hunt) and Gold medal 40+ mixed doubles (with Julie Bradbury)
 2013 World Championships Ankara Turkey – Silver medal 35+ men's doubles (with Lee Clapham )and Gold medal 40+ mixed doubles (with Julie Bradbury)
 2014 European Championships Portugal – Gold medal 45+ mixed doubles (with Julie Bradbury)
 2016 European Championships Slovenia – Gold medal 40+ men's doubles ( with Dan Plant)
 2017 World Championships Cochin, India – Gold medal 45+ mixed doubles (with Julie Bradbury)

References

External links 
 European results
 
 All England Champions 1899-2007
 Statistics at badmintonengland.co.uk
 World Championships

1966 births
Living people
Sportspeople from London
English male badminton players
Badminton players at the 1992 Summer Olympics
Badminton players at the 1996 Summer Olympics
Olympic badminton players of Great Britain
Badminton players at the 1994 Commonwealth Games
Commonwealth Games gold medallists for England
Commonwealth Games bronze medallists for England
Commonwealth Games medallists in badminton
Medallists at the 1994 Commonwealth Games